Li Fengyin (born 21 August 1997) is a Chinese footballer currently playing as a defender for Qingdao Red Lions .

Club career
After returning to China in 2018 with Shijiazhuang Ever Bright, Li signed for Qingdao Youth Island ahead of the 2021 China League Two season.

Career statistics

Club

Notes

References

1997 births
Living people
Chinese footballers
Association football defenders
China League Two players
C.D. Mafra players
C.D. Cova da Piedade players
A.R.C. Oleiros players
Cangzhou Mighty Lions F.C. players
Chinese expatriate footballers
Chinese expatriate sportspeople in Portugal
Expatriate footballers in Portugal
GS Loures players